Seals and Crofts is the debut album of pop/folk duo Seals and Crofts.

Track listing 
All songs written by Jim Seals unless otherwise indicated.
"See My Life"
"Sea of Consciousness"
"Seldom's Sister"
"Not Be Found"
"Birthday of My Thoughts"
"In Tune"
"'Cows of Gladness"
"Earth"
"Seven Valleys" (Jim Seals, Dash Crofts)
"Jekyll and Hyde"
"Ashes in the Snow"
"See My Life (Reprise)"

Charts

Personnel 
 Jim Seals – vocals, guitar
 Dash Crofts – vocals, mandolin
 Louie Shelton – bass
 Jim Gordon – drums
 Victor Feldman – percussion
 Bill Holman – orchestral arrangements
 Bill Holan and His Orchestra - orchestra
Technical
Ann McClelland - assistant producer
Rik Pekkonen - engineer
Wayne Kimbell - art direction
George Rodriguez - photography

References 

Seals and Crofts albums
1969 debut albums